This is a timeline documenting events of Jazz in the year 1912.

Events
 W.C. Handy wrote "The Memphis Blues", and it became a great hit, making the publishing start of the Blues.
 The singer Bessie Smith starts working as a vaudeville dancer.
 Louis Armstrong forms a vocal quartet together with some long time friends in New Orleans.

Standards

Births

 January
 1 – Svein Øvergaard, Norwegian saxophonist and percussionist (died 1986).
 7 – Bob Zurke, American pianist, arranger, and composer (died 1944).
 12 – Trummy Young, African-American trombonist (died 1984).
 22 – Harry Parry, Welsh clarinetist and bandleader (died 1956).

 February
 12 – Paul Bascomb, American tenor saxophonist (died 1986).

 March
 1 – Joseph Reinhardt, French guitarist and composer (died 1982).
 2 – Red Saunders, American drummer and bandleader (died 1981).
 12
 Jiří Traxler, Czech-Canadian pianist, composer, lyricist, and arranger (died 2011).
 Paul Weston, American pianist, arranger, composer, and conductor (died 1996).

 April
 2 – Herbert Mills, American singer, Mills Brothers (died 1989).
 11 – John Levy, African-American upright bassist (died 2012).

 May
 9 – George T. Simon, American writer and drummer (died 2001).
 13 – Gil Evans, Canadian pianist, arranger, composer, and bandleader (died 1988).
 14 – Les Brown, American bandleader (died 2001).
 28 – Dave Barbour, American guitarist (died 1965).

 June
 15 – Alix Combelle, French tenor saxophonist, clarinetist, and bandleader (died 1978).
 26 – Clarence Profit, American pianist and composer (died 1944).

 July
 8 – Johnny Mince, American clarinetist (died 1997).
 12 – Will Bradley, American trombonist and bandleader (died 1989).
 27 – Asser Fagerström, Finnish pianist, composer, and actor (died 1990).

 August
 13 – Nate Kazebier, American trumpeter (died 1969).
 26 – Léo Marjane, French singer (died 2016).

 September
 7 – Alvin Alcorn, American trumpeter (died 2003).
 9 – Jean Omer, Belgian reedist and bandleader (died 1994).
 27 – Erhard Bauschke, German reedist and bandleader (died 1945).
 30 – Bill Johnson, American saxophonist, clarinetist, and arranger (died 1960).

 October
 5 – Ernst Höllerhagen, German reedist (died 1956).
 7 – Beverly Peer, American upright bassist (died 1997).
 13 – Nellie Lutcher, African-American singer and pianist (died 2007).
 19 – Red Richards, American pianist (died 1998).
 21 – Don Byas, American tenor saxophonist (died 1972).
 27 – Gösta Törner, Swedish jazz trumpeter and bandleader (died 1982).

 November
 1 – Franz Jackson, American saxophonist and clarinetist (died 2008).
 13 – Ted Donnelly, American trombonist (died 1958).
 23
 Svein Øvergaard, Norwegian saxophonist, percussionist, and bandleader (died 1986).
 Anselmo Sacasas, Cuban pianist, bandleader, composer, and arranger (died 1998).
 24 – Teddy Wilson, American pianist (died 1986).

 December
 5 – Marshall Royal, American clarinetist and alto saxophonist (died 1995).
 6 – Paloma Efron, Argentine singer (died 1977).
 10 – Irving Fazola, American clarinetist (died 1949).
 24 – Anne Lenner, English singer (died 1997).
 29 – Thore Ehrling, Swedish trumpeter, composer, and bandleader (died 1994).

References

External links
 History Of Jazz Timeline: 1912 at All About Jazz

Jazz by year
Jazz, 1912 In